Mount Crawford is a mountain with two summits, standing  northwest of Mount Dawson in the northern part of the main ridge of the Sentinel Range. It was discovered by Lincoln Ellsworth on his trans-Antarctic flight of November 23, 1935, and named by the Advisory Committee on Antarctic Names for William B. Crawford, Jr., of the Branch of Special Maps, U.S. Geological Survey, which prepared the 1962 map of this range.

See also
 Mountains in Antarctica

References
 

Mountains of Ellsworth Land